is a railway station on the Nara Line in Nara, Japan, operated by the private railway operator Kintetsu Railway.

Lines
The station is the terminal station on the Nara Line. Kintetsu operates through expresses and limited expresses from Kyoto Station and Ōsaka Namba Station in Osaka. Passengers taking non through trains from Kyoto on the Kyoto Line have to change trains at Yamato-Saidaiji Station to get to Kintetsu Nara.

Station layout	
The station consists of four platforms with four tracks on the second basement level.

Platforms

Adjacent stations

History
The station opened on 30 April 1914, initially named .

Passenger statistics
In 2010, the station was used by an average of 67,761 passengers daily.

Surrounding area
The station is located next to Kōfuku-ji and Nara Park; it is also possible to walk to the UNESCO World Heritage Sites of Tōdai-ji, and the Kasuga Shrine. Outside the station, passengers can also connect to buses and taxis.

Nara Station on the JR West Lines is located approximately 15 minutes to the southwest.

References

External links

 Kintetsu station information 

Kintetsu Nara
Buildings and structures in Nara, Nara
Railway stations in Japan opened in 1914